William Alexander Sutherland (December 1, 1876 – May 21, 1969) was an American football coach and lawyer. He served as the head football coach at New Mexico College of Agriculture and Mechanic Arts—now known as New Mexico State University—in 1900, compiling a record of 3–3–1. Sutherland was an 1898 graduate of New Mexico A&M and worked as a lawyer in Las Cruces.

Head coaching record

References

External links
 

1876 births
1969 deaths
New Mexico lawyers
New Mexico State Aggies football coaches
New Mexico State University alumni
People from Corpus Christi, Texas
People from Las  Cruces, New Mexico